Air Chief Marshal Ioannis Giangos (born 1951) is a retired Greek Air Force officer and a former Chief of the National Defense General Staff of Greece. He served as an interim Minister for National Defence in the Caretaker Cabinet of Vassiliki Thanou-Christophilou.

Career
Ioannis Giangos was born in December 1951 in Trikala, Thessaly. He attended the Greek Air Force Academy and graduated in 1974 as a pilot officer. His initial assignment was in the 117 Combat Wing stationed at Andravida Air force Base, as an F-4 Phantom II aircraft pilot. During his career as a command pilot he served as fighter squadron and tactical fighter wing commander in several units of the Greek Air Force, with more than 4,200 flying hours in a variety of aircraft, 3,000 of which in F-4 and F-16 C/D fighter jets. He is an alumnus of various military schools both in Greece and abroad. Air Chief Marshal Giangos served as Staff Officer in the plans and policy branch at the Supreme Headquarters Allied Powers Europe (SHAPE) in Mons, Belgium and as Commander of the NATO Combined Air Operations Centre-7, in Larissa, Greece.

From January 2007 to August 2009, as Air Marshal, Giangos held the post of Chief of the Hellenic Air Force General Staff]]. During this period the fighter aircraft fleet of the Greek Air Force was increased to 170, as result of the 'Peace Xenia IV' purchase program from Lockheed Martin of 30 additional F-16 Block 52+ aircraft.

On August 6, 2009, following a decision of the Government Council for Foreign Affairs and Defense (KYSEA), he was nominated for appointment to the rank of Air Chief Marshal and the office of the Chief of National Defense General Staff. In September 2009, during discussions with Supreme Allied Commander Europe, U.S. Admiral James Stavridis, Giangos outlined the country's positions concerning participation of Greece in NATO peace-keeping missions as well as the present situation of the Aegean dispute. He held the post until his retirement, on 3 November 2011.

Giangos was appointed as the interim Minister for National Defence in the Caretaker Cabinet of Vassiliki Thanou-Christophilou on 28 August 2015. He served until the legislative election on 20 September.

Military awards
 Medal of Military Merit 1st Class
 Outstanding Command Commendation Medal 1st Class
 Grand Cross of the Order of the Phoenix
 Grand Commander of the Order of Honour
 Staff Officer Commendation Medal 1st Class
 Formation – Major Unit Command Commendation Medal 1st Class
 General Staff Command Commendation Medal
 Star of Merit and Honour Commendation Medal

Personal life
Giangos is married and has three children.

References

 

1951 births
Living people
People from Trikala
Hellenic Air Force air marshals
Grand Crosses of the Order of the Phoenix (Greece)
Grand Commanders of the Order of Honour (Greece)
Chiefs of the Hellenic National Defence General Staff
Ministers of National Defence of Greece
20th-century Greek military personnel
21st-century Greek military personnel
Chiefs of the Hellenic Air Force General Staff